The Strand by-election, 1891 may refer to:
Strand by-election, May 1891
Strand by-election, October 1891